Ashley Brokaw (born  1972) is an American fashion casting director, known for her work with Italian luxury fashion house Prada. In 2015, The New York Times said she is "the person who is most responsible for what we think is beautiful."

Early life 
Brokaw was raised in England, and then came to the United States to go to boarding school in Connecticut. Brokaw has a bachelor of science degree in international and organization from Georgetown University.

Career
Brokaw is known for her work casting models in fashion shows. At age 17, Brokaw interned for Juliet Taylor, a movie casting director. She helped in finding Juliette Lewis for the role of Danielle in Cape Fear. She started her career in fashion working at Seventeen, then as a production assistant for the photographer Bruce Weber.

Since 2011, Brokaw principally casts for Prada where she replaced Russell Marsh. She has also worked with Balenciaga, Rag & Bone, Proenza Schouler, Nicolas Ghesquière at Louis Vuitton, Coach New York, and JW Anderson.

In 2017 she spoke with Vogue about the increased importance of the 'personal style' of models. By 2021, Brokaw was expanding her search parameters for models to include videos so she can gauge personalities of potential models. In 2022, she publicly supported Ukrainian models following the Russian invasion of Ukraine.

Models

References 

Living people
American casting directors
Women casting directors
Georgetown University alumni
People from New Milford, Connecticut
American expatriates in England
Year of birth missing (living people)